Maratus mungaich, the banksia peacock spider, is a species of jumping spider  in the family Salticidae. It is endemic to Western Australia.

The species was first described in 1995 by Julianne Waldock. In 2013 she described a species-group for Maratus mungaich. In 2014 Waldock identified Maratus hortorum which had until then been identified as M.mungaich.

In courtship, males in the Maratus genus extend their elongated third legs, and only the male is so brightly and beautifully coloured.

Etymology
The specific epithet, mungaich, derives from a Nyoongar word for "banksia" (mangatch).

References

External links
Maratus mungaich occurrence data records from OZCAM

Salticidae
Spiders of Australia
Spiders described in 1995